The Monument to Daoiz and Velarde (Spanish: Monumento a Daoiz y Velarde) is an instance of public art in Segovia, Spain. Designed by Aniceto Marinas, it is a memorial to Luis Daoiz y Torres and Pedro Velarde y Santillán, two Spanish artillery officers who fell fighting against the French army at the 1808 Dos de Mayo Uprising, in the context of the Peninsular War. It is located near the Alcázar of Segovia.

History and description 

The laying of the foundation stone was held on 6 May 1908, on the occasion of the festivities taking place in early May for the 100th anniversary of the Dos de Mayo uprising.

The first body of the pedestal lies in the centre of a wide platform with granite steps. It supports robust mouldings on which the frustum emerges. The sides of the pedestal are ornamented by two large reliefs and by two plaques displaying the coats of arms of Seville (Daoíz's homeland), and Santander (Velarde's homeland) and the respective commemorative inscriptions. An allegory of History lies on the steps of the pedestal; it is sculpted on white marble, contrasting with a bronze relief depicting the last stand at the Monteleón artillery barracks. The other relief shows Daoiz rallying the people of Madrid, engaged in a desperate struggle against the French troops.

The allegorical figure of Spain tops off the monument, holding the dying bodies of the two artillerymen in her arms, wrapped in the national flag. In the lower part there is an eagle, clutching the rock with one of its claws, fighting to pull out the flag with the other claw.

Toribio García de Andrés worked in the basement's building works.

The monument was unveiled on 15 July 1910 by Alfonso XIII.

References 
Citations

Bibliography
 
 

Peninsular War monuments and memorials
Stone sculptures in Spain
Bronze sculptures in Spain
Monuments and memorials in Castile and León
Sculptures of men in Spain
Buildings and structures in Segovia
Statues of military officers
Outdoor sculptures in Castile and León